The Kambar-Ata-2 Hydro Power Plant is a hydroelectric power station on the river Naryn near Kara-Jygach, Toktogul District, Kyrgyzstan. When completed, it will have 3 individual Francis turbine-generators with a nominal output of around 120 MW each which will deliver up to 360 MW of power. The first generator was operational on November 27, 2010.

References

Hydroelectric power stations in Kyrgyzstan
Dams in Kyrgyzstan
Dams completed in 2010
Dams on the Naryn River
Energy infrastructure completed in 2010
2010 establishments in Kyrgyzstan